Senecio littoralis, the woolly ragwort, is a species of flowering plant in the family Asteraceae. It is endemic to the Falkland Islands. Its natural habitats are temperate shrubland, rocky areas, and rocky shores. This species is threatened by habitat loss.

References

littoralis
Flora of the Falkland Islands
Least concern plants
Taxonomy articles created by Polbot